Transversotrema borboleta is a species of parasitic flatworms found in chaetodontids and lutjanines on Heron Island and Lizard Island. It might be in fact a species complex.

References

Further reading
Cribb, Thomas H., et al. "Biogeography of tropical Indo-West Pacific parasites: A cryptic species of Transversotrema and evidence for rarity of Transversotrematidae (Trematoda) in French Polynesia." Parasitology international 63.2 (2014): 285–294.
Bray, Rodney A., and Thomas H. Cribb. "Are cryptic species a problem for parasitological biological tagging for stock identification of aquatic organisms?."Parasitology 142.01 (2015): 125-133.
Yong, R., et al. "The ghost of parasites past: eggs of the blood fluke Cardicola chaetodontis (Aporocotylidae) trapped in the heart and gills of butterflyfishes (Perciformes: Chaetodontidae) of the Great Barrier Reef." Parasitology 140.09 (2013): 1186–1194.

External links

Plagiorchiida
Animals described in 2012